is a Pokémon species in Nintendo and Game Freak's Pokémon franchise. Created by Ken Sugimori, Unown first appeared in the video games Pokémon Gold and Silver and in subsequent sequels, later appearing in various merchandise, spin off titles and animated and printed adaptations of the franchise. Unlike other characters in the franchise, Unown do not have singular voice actors, but instead are voiced by several at once.

Commonly referred to as the Symbol Pokémon, Unown are hieroglyph-like, thin, black ancient Pokémon usually found on walls. There are 28 forms of Unown: one for each letter of the English alphabet, a question mark, and an exclamation point. They were featured as the main antagonists of Spell of the Unown, the third Pokémon movie. Unown have also appeared in Super Smash Bros. Melee and the Pokémon Adventures manga. Unown does not evolve. Its name is pronounced un-OWN, according to the 2012 Pokémon Scholastic Guide, as if it were "an on", although most people pronounce it like the word "unknown" (including in the anime).

Design and characteristics

Unown were created by Ken Sugimori for the 1999 Game Boy games, Pokémon Gold and Silver. Unown began as an alien-type Pokémon, but when artists began to sketch them, they started to look like letters of the alphabet, and the Pokémon eventually became Psychic-type.

Unown are hieroglyph-like, thin, black symbols usually found on walls. First appearing in Pokémon Gold and Silver, Unown have 28 different forms, based on the letters of the Latin alphabet; the two punctuation marks of a question mark and an exclamation point were added in Pokémon Ruby and Sapphire (but unavailable until Pokémon FireRed and LeafGreen). In the Pokémon universe, it is said that each form has different abilities. It is unknown whether the Unown came first, or the letters they resemble. The in-game Pokédex states that Unown can make telepathic contact with other beings. If multiple Unown come together, their power increases, which is shown in Pokémon 3: The Movie, where a large cluster of Unown come together and are able to bend reality. Unown's only known move in battle is "Hidden Power", an attack whose type depends on the individual values of the user. While only thirteen other Pokémon learn the move by level as Unown does, due to the move's TM, almost all Pokémon can learn it. In the movie, Professor Oak studies a new pair of Unown, which are actually modelled after Cyrillic.

Appearances

In video games
Unown made its debut appearance in the Pokémon series in Pokémon Gold and Silver. In this game, they can be found in the Ruins of Alph of Johto and are triggered once the player completes the puzzles in the caves found in the Ruins, later appearing in other Pokémon games such as Pokémon Crystal, Pokémon Ruby and Sapphire, Pokémon Emerald, Pokémon FireRed and LeafGreen, Pokémon Diamond and Pearl, Pokémon Platinum, Pokémon HeartGold and SoulSilver, Pokémon Black and White, Pokémon Black 2 and White 2, Pokémon X and Y and Pokémon Omega Ruby and Alpha Sapphire. Shiny Unown made its debut in Pokémon Go on July 25, 2020 as part of the Go Fest 2020 event, in which "G" and "O" were released shiny, appearing also in Pokémon Trozei!, Pokémon Mystery Dungeon: Blue Rescue Team and Red Rescue Team, Pokémon Mystery Dungeon: Explorers of Time and Explorers of Darkness, Pokémon Mystery Dungeon: Explorers of Sky, Pokémon Rumble Blast, Pokémon Rumble U, Pokémon Battle Trozei, Pokémon Shuffle, Pokémon Rumble World, Pokémon Picross and Pokémon Rumble Rush.

In Super Smash Bros. Melee, Unown appear when released from a Poké Ball and will fly off the screen. They then return with a large swarm similar to that of Beedrill in the original Super Smash Bros. The only difference is that Beedrill only attack from left or right while Unown can come from any direction. Opponents caught in this are damaged and juggled. There are also Unown that can be seen on the Pokéfloat stage. In the second half of the cycle, they fly across the screen. Towards the end of the cycle, staying on the stage relies on hopping between the Unown. The Unown also appear as an obtainable trophy. In Super Smash Bros. Ultimate Unown does not appear from a Poké Ball but instead as a collectible spirit appearing in its F form.

In other media
The Unown are the main antagonists of Spell of the Unown, the third Pokémon movie. In the movie, the Unown send Professor Hale into their dimension. Later, Molly Hale releases Unown from their dimension. The Unown, reading Molly's mind, make her wishes come true, including turning Greenfield into crystal and creating Entei to be Molly's new dad. Because Molly also wants a mother, Entei kidnaps Ash Ketchum's mom. Eventually, Molly, upon seeing the consequences of her wishes, realizes that what she is doing is wrong and she wants to stop, but the power of the Unown is out of control. Entei destroys the psychic energy shield around the Unown, sacrificing himself in the process. The Unown are sent back into their dimension, and Professor Hale is released in Journey to The Unown from the Unown dimension. The Unown also make a brief cameo in the tenth Pokémon movie Pokémon: The Rise of Darkrai, in the scenes where Dialga and Palkia are seen fighting each other in the space-time rift dimension, swarms of Unown are seen floating about, many of which are blown away by Dialga and Palkia's attacks.

In the Pokémon Adventures manga, Unown first appear in Volume 8, when Gold and Bugsy are in the Ruins of Alph. Gold has his Sunkern use Flash to blind Team Rocket, but this accidentally disturbs the Unown from their slumber. Bugsy later returns to study the Ruins further in Volume 11, where he captures a "G"-shaped Unown. Unown later appear in Volume 24, having been awakened by Sird from the Tanoby Ruins to use as a distraction while she fought Lorelei. The Unown later appear again throughout the volume, being employed by Team Rocket as living security cameras while impeding the progress of Red, Blue and Green. They show up in the DP saga when Diamond, Pearl and Platinum visit Solaceon Town. Diamond and Pearl befriend two Unown, "D" and "P", who behave like each of them, respectively.

Critical reception
Variety described Unown as "purely abstract", further feeling them as having none of the appeal of other Pokémon species and "a bad idea that gets worse". IGN described them as "probably the single most useless Pokemon in existence", noting its contrast to other weaker Pokémon which would by comparison evolve into stronger forms eventually, and further described their sole appeal as one for children intending to use them to spell out profanity. Kat Bailey, also writing for IGN, noted it as the worst Pokémon design introduced in Gold and Silver, describing the Unown as "An Irritating Sidequest Approaches" and as the worst Pokemon of all time. 1UP.com named them the fifth "Lamest Pokémon" in the franchise, describing them as "silly gimmick Pokémon" and "useless" for in-game battles and other in-game events. GamesRadar called them "pretty awful", further describing them as "about as threatening as a vat of Alphabits". Kotaku's Patricia Hernandez cited Unown as an example of the second generation's quality and saying that Unown's design isn't getting worse, and claiming its cuteness. WhatCulture'''s Chris Comb included Unown in his list of the "laziest" and most "ill-conceived" Pokémon. He stated that he was interested in the Unown as a child, but grew to dislike them when he realized that they were less "rare, exciting, and useful" than they seemed. He claimed that it was "one of the first fears of Pokémon running out of ideas."

However, in an analysis of the article on 1UP FM'', the host argued otherwise, feeling that while odd the characters had some appeal with children and further described it as "another layer of insanity" for people who were already interested in collecting all the species. In 2006, research was done on using Unown to teach the biological concepts of classification and phylogeny to students, with the researchers finding the results to be "very encouraging".

References

External links

 Unown TrueType font (Right click, save-as)
 Unown on Bulbapedia
 Unown on Pokemon.com

Pokémon species
Extraterrestrial characters in video games
Video game characters introduced in 1999
Fictional psychics
Eyes in culture
Constructed scripts in fiction